Sean Daly (born 1972) is an Irish hurler who presently plays with Lismore GAA at club level and formerly with Waterford GAA at inter-county level.  Sean for a time also played with Erin's Own GAA of Glounthaune, County Cork.  Daly's greatest achievement was winning the All-Ireland Under-21 Hurling Championship with Waterford in 1992.

Honours
 All-Ireland Under 21 Hurling Championship winner - 1992
 Munster Under-21 Hurling Championship winner - 1992
 Waterford Senior Hurling Championship winner - 1991 and 1993
 Waterford Minor Hurling Championship winner - 1990

Championship Appearances

References

1972 births
Living people
Waterford inter-county hurlers
Lismore hurlers